The Andante with variations in F minor (Hoboken 17/6), also known as Un piccolo divertimento, was composed for piano by Joseph Haydn in 1793, and is among his most popular piano works.  (The late British composer and pianist John McCabe, in his booklet note accompanying his boxed set of recordings of Haydn's complete solo keyboard music, was of the opinion that it was possibly inspired by the death of Maria Anna von Genzinger (1754–93, called "Marianne") [p. 23].  McCabe also says that this piece is Haydn's "most extended and most resourceful such work for the keyboard" [p. 22].)  The variations here are a set of double variations, the first theme is in F minor and the second theme in F major.  Two variations of each theme and an extended coda follow.

The manuscript of the Variations is owned by the Music Division of The New York Public Library for the Performing Arts.  For the Haydn bicentennial in 2009, G. Henle Verlag published a facsimile of the manuscript.

References
David Ewen, Encyclopedia of Concert Music.  New York; Hill and Wang, 1959.

External links 
Franz Joseph Haydn - Kaiserlied & Variation in f-Moll, Sonata un picolo Divertimento, Hob. XVII/6 (up to 1:26)

BBC Discovering Music Program for Symphony #98 and Variations in F minor

1793 compositions
Variations
Compositions by Joseph Haydn
Compositions for solo piano
Compositions in F minor